Eat and Run is a 1986 American comedy science fiction horror film directed by Christopher Hart with the script by Christopher Hart and Stan Hart. The film starred Ron Silver, Sharon Schlarth and R. L. Ryan.

Plot
A humanoid alien (R. L. Ryan) lands on Earth and soon discovers he likes to eat Italian people. Detective McSorely (Ron Silver) is an incompetent police officer, and the only one who knows what's going on. The rest of the police force thinks McSorely has gone nuts, while the alien continues eating the Italian population of New York City.

Cast
Ron Silver as Mickey McSorely 
Sharon Schlarth as Judge Cheryl Cohen
R. L. Ryan as Murray Creature 
John J. Fleming as The Police Captain
Derek Murcott as Sorely McSorely
Robert Silver as Pusher
Mimi Cecchini as Grandmother
Tony Moundroukas as Zepoli Kid
Tom Mardirosian as Scarpetti

External links

Official trailer

1986 films
1980s comedy horror films
1980s science fiction horror films
1986 horror films
American psychological horror films
American science fiction comedy films
American science fiction horror films
American independent films
American parody films
Films set in New York City
1986 comedy films
New World Pictures films
1980s English-language films
1980s American films